Ion Luca Caragiale National College may refer to one of three educational institutions in Romania:

Ion Luca Caragiale National College (Bucharest)
Ion Luca Caragiale National College (Moreni)
Ion Luca Caragiale National College (Ploiești)